Tayeb Salih (12 July 1929 – 18 February 2009) was a Sudanese writer, cultural journalist for the BBC Arabic programme as well as for Arabic journals, and a staff member of UNESCO. He is best known for his novel Season of Migration to the North, considered to be one of the most important novels in Arabic literature. His novels and short stories have been translated into English and more than a dozen other languages.

Biography
Born in Karmakol, a village on the Nile near Al Dabbah, Sudan, in the Northern Province of Sudan, he graduated from University of Khartoum with a Bachelor of Science, before leaving for the University of London in the United Kingdom. Coming from a background of small farmers and religious teachers, his original intention was to work in agriculture. However, excluding a brief spell as a schoolmaster before moving to England, he worked in journalism and the promotion of international cultural exchange.

For more than ten years, Salih wrote a weekly column for the London-based Arabic language newspaper al Majalla, in which he explored various literary themes. He worked for the BBC's Arabic Service and later became director general of the Ministry of Information in Doha, Qatar. The last ten years of his working career, he spent at UNESCO headquarters in Paris, where he held various posts and was UNESCO's representative for the Arab states of the Persian Gulf.

Literary career

Salih's writing draws important inspiration from his youth in a Sudanese village; life that is centered on rural people and their complex relationships. "At various levels and with varying degrees of psychoanalytic emphasis, he deals with themes of reality and illusion, the cultural dissonance between the West and the exotic Orient, the harmony and conflict of brotherhood, and the individual's responsibility to find a fusion between his or her contradictions." Furthermore, the motifs of his books are derived from his religious experience as a Muslim in 20th-century Sudan, both pre- and post-colonial. Another, more general subject of Salih's writing is the confrontation of the Arab Muslim and the Western European world.

In 1966, Salih published his novel Mawsim al-Hijrah ilâ al-Shimâl (Season of Migration to the North), for which he is best known. It was first published in the Beirut journal Hiwâr. The main concern of the novel is with the impact of British colonialism and European modernity on rural African societies in general, and on Sudanese culture and identity in particular. His novel reflects the conflicts of modern Sudan and depicts the brutal history of European colonialism as shaping the reality of contemporary Sudanese society. Season of Migration to the North is a story told to an unspecified audience by the unnamed narrator, a “traveled man” and an African who has returned after having spent years abroad. He returns to his Sudanese village of Wad Hamid on the Nile in the 1950s after having written a PhD thesis on ‘the life of an obscure English poet’. Mustafa Sa'eed, the main protagonist of the novel, is a child of British colonialism, and a fruit of colonial education.

In his essay "The New Novel in Sudan", published in Banipal magazine's issue of spring 1966 on Sudanese Literature today, Sudanese writer Emad Blake remarked that Salih "confronted the crucial issues of his time, such as the clash of Eastern and Western civilizations, as well as boldly employing sex and a style of writing we might term the 'impossible easy'."

The Damascus-based Arab Literary Academy named it one of the best novels in Arabic of the twentieth century. Upon its publication, it was banned in Salih's native Sudan for several years, because of its partly sexual content and despite the fact that it won him prominence and international fame. The novel was also adapted into a theatre production in Israel.

Urs' al-Zayn (published in English as The Wedding of Zein) is a novella, published in 1966, centering on the unlikely nuptials of the town eccentric Zein. Tall and odd-looking, with just two teeth in his mouth, Zein has made a reputation for himself as the man who falls in love over and over with girls who promptly marry other men, – to the point where mothers seek him out in hopes that he will draw the eye of available suitors to their eligible daughters. "The Wedding of Zein" was made into a drama in Libya and won Kuwaiti filmmaker Khalid Siddiq an award at the Cannes Film Festival in the late 1970s.

In his reflections on Salih's literary style, his translator Denys Johnson-Davies wrote that Salih "exploited to the full the richness of the literary language in his narrative and uses the vivid local dialect for his dialog. [...] Tayeb Salih’s work shows his wide reading in the byways of Arabic literature, including poetry, which has helped to fashion a style which is direct and fluent, a style which an Arab critic has described as being closer to dramatic writing than that of the novel."

Awards in honour of Tayeb Salih 

In 1998, a group of Salih's friends formed a committee to honour him, and collected $20,000 for his personal use. He chose to use the money to establish the Tayeb Salih Creative Writing Award. 

Awarded since 2002, the al-Tayeb Salih Prize for Literary Creativity is a literary prize for Sudanese novels, presented by the Abdel Karim Mirghani Cultural Center in Omdurman, and is dedicated to first novels by emerging Sudanese writers.

Since 2010, another award, called the al-Tayeb Salih Award for Creative Writing, has been granted to outstanding modern Arab writers in the fields of novel, short story, and critical studies. The award has been sponsored by telecommunications company Zain Sudan and has been critically seen by some Sudanese intellectuals, calling it “an attempt to control the Sudanese cultural scene” by the Ministry of Culture.

Bibliography
نخلة على الجدول [Nakhla 'ala al-jadwal] (1953). "A Date Palm by the Stream"
دومة ود حامد [Douma wad Hamid] (1960). "The Doum Tree of Wad Hamid", trans. Denys Johnson-Davies (1962)
 حفنة تمر [Hafna tamar] (1964). "A Handful of Dates", trans. Denys Johnson-Davies (1966)
عرس الزين [Urs al-Zayn] (1966). The Wedding of Zein, trans. Denys Johnson-Davies (1968)
موسم الهجرة إلى الشمال [Mawsim al-Hijra ila ash-Shamal] (1966). Season of Migration to the North, trans. Denys Johnson-Davies (1969)
ضو البيت / بندرشاه [Bandarshah I: Daw al-Bayt] (1971)
مريود / بندرشاه [Bandarshah II: Maryud] (1976)
1976: "The Cypriot Man", trans. Denys Johnson-Davies (1980)
Complete Works (1984)
منسي إنسان نادر على طريقته (2004, memoir). Mansi: A Rare Man in His Own Way, trans. Adil Babikir (2020)
Compilations in English

 The Wedding of Zein and Other Stories (1968). Trans. Denys Johnson-Davies. Includes: The Doum Tree of Wad Hamid, A Handful of Dates and The Wedding of Zein.
Season of Migration to the North / The Wedding of Zein (1980). Trans. Denys Johnson-Davies
Bandarshah (1996). Trans. Denys Johnson-Davies

Themes of some of his magazine articles, published in Arabic:

 The shining stars are like the stars of the Arab and Frankish flags, 2005
 For cities, uniqueness and modernity - East - 2005
 Cities have uniqueness and modernity - the West - 2005
 In the company of Al-Mutanabi and his companions, 2005
 In Janadriyah and Assilah, 2005
 My homeland, Sudan, 2005
 Memories of the seasons 2005
 Thoughts of travel 2005
 Introductions 2009

Death 
Salih died on 18 February 2009 in London. His body was buried on 20 February in Sudan, where the funeral ceremony was attended by a large number of prominent personalities and Arab writers, as well as the then Sudanese President Omar Al-Bashir, writer and former Prime Minister Sadiq Al Mahdi, and Muhammad Othman Al-Mirghani.

Tribute
On July 12, 2017, Google Doodle commemorated Tayeb Salih's 88th birthday.

See also 

 Sudanese literature
 List of Sudanese writers
 Modern Arabic literature

References

External links
Tayeb Salih at goodreads
"Lire Saison de la migration vers le Nord de Tayeb Sâlih", by Salah Natij 

1929 births
2009 deaths
Sudanese male writers
Sudanese novelists
University of Khartoum alumni
Alumni of the University of London